Jussi Wihonen is a Finnish politician currently serving in the Parliament of Finland for the Finns Party representing the Savonia-Karelia constituency.

References

Living people
Members of the Parliament of Finland (2019–23)
Finns Party politicians
21st-century Finnish politicians
Year of birth missing (living people)